NGC 54 is an edge-on spiral galaxy in the constellation of Cetus. The galaxy was discovered by Wilhelm Tempel in 1886, and he defined it as "very faint, pretty small, round." The galaxy is 90,000 light years in diameter, making it slightly smaller than the Milky Way.

See also  
 List of NGC objects (1–1000)

References

External links 
 
 
 SEDS

0054
1011
Barred spiral galaxies
IRAS catalogue objects
Cetus (constellation)
18861021